Josh Huff (born October 14, 1991) is a professional gridiron football wide receiver who is a free agent. He was drafted by the Philadelphia Eagles in the third round of the 2014 NFL Draft. Huff played college football at Oregon. He also been a member of the Tampa Bay Buccaneers, New Orleans Saints, Arizona Hotshots, Calgary Stampeders, and Toronto Argonauts.

High school
Huff attended Nimitz High School in Houston, Texas, where he was a letterman in football and track. In football, he played on the same team as fellow NFL player Marion Grice. He played quarterback, wide receiver, running back and cornerback for the Cougars, accumulating nearly 2,000 yards of total offense as a senior, as he rushed for 1,147 yards and 11 touchdowns and threw for 856 more yards. He was named a 2008 Class 5A second-team all-district on offense.

In addition to football, Huff also competed as a sprinter for the school's track & field team. He recorded a personal-best time of 10.86 seconds in the 100 meters on his way to a second-place finish at the 19-5A district meet as a junior. He was also a member of the 4 × 200m relay squad.

Recruiting

College career
Huff attended the University of Oregon from 2010 to 2013. During his career, he caught 144 passes for 2,366 yards and 24 touchdowns. In his senior year he broke the school record for receiving yards in a single season with 1,140 yards, the previous record was 1,123 yards and was set in 1970.

He was also named honorable mention All-Pac-12 in both his junior and senior seasons.

Professional career

Philadelphia Eagles
Huff was drafted by the Philadelphia Eagles in the third round of the 2014 NFL draft with the 86th overall pick, reuniting Huff with former Oregon head coach Chip Kelly. On May 13, he signed a four-year deal with the team.

In 2014, Huff had a 107-yard opening kickoff return for a touchdown against the Tennessee Titans, the longest play in Eagles history. While Huff saw limited action as a wide receiver in 2014, his play time began to increase in 2015. In week five against the New Orleans Saints he caught his first touchdown from Sam Bradford. Against the Miami Dolphins he caught another touchdown but the Eagles were not able to win the game, eventually losing 20–19. The following week Huff caught another touchdown pass, this time from Mark Sanchez (filling in for an injured Bradford), but the Eagles lost 45–17. In 2015, after only catching 8 passes for 24 yards in his first 5 games, Huff had his best game of the young season in a win against the undefeated Minnesota Vikings, catching all 4 of his targets for 39 yards and returning a kickoff 98 yards for a touchdown. Huff followed this up with only 1 catch for 9 yards against the Dallas Cowboys but also had a 53-yard return.

On November 1, 2016, Huff was arrested with marijuana and a firearm in his vehicle. Despite statements by coach Doug Pederson that Huff would still play the following week, Huff was released by the Eagles on November 3.

Tampa Bay Buccaneers
Huff was signed to the Tampa Bay Buccaneers' practice squad on November 7, 2016. He was promoted to the active roster on December 6, 2016.

On September 2, 2017, Huff was released by the Buccaneers.

New Orleans Saints
On January 18, 2018, Huff signed a reserve/future contract with the New Orleans Saints. On March 19, 2018, Huff was suspended two games for violating the league's policies on substances for abuse and personal conduct stemming from a November 2016 arrest. He was released on August 21, 2018.

Arizona Hotshots
In January 2019, Huff joined the Arizona Hotshots of the Alliance of American Football. He was placed on injured reserve on March 7, 2019.

Calgary Stampeders
After the AAF ceased operations in April 2019, Huff signed with the Calgary Stampeders of the Canadian Football League (CFL) on May 8, 2019. In his first season in the league he played in 10 games, catching 37 passes for 491 yards with one touchdown. After the CFL canceled the 2020 season due to the COVID-19 pandemic, Huff chose to opt-out of his contract with the Stampeders on August 31, 2020. He re-signed with the Stampeders on December 22, 2020. Huff played in nine games for the Stampeders in 2021 catching 37 passes for 507 yards. With only two games left in the regular season Huff was released by the Stampeders on November 5, 2021.

Toronto Argonauts
On November 9, 2021, it was announced that Huff had signed with the Toronto Argonauts. He became a free agent upon the expiry of his contract on February 8, 2022.

Career statistics

References

External links
Philadelphia Eagles bio
Oregon Ducks bio

Living people
1991 births
Players of American football from Houston
Players of Canadian football from Houston
American football wide receivers
Oregon Ducks football players
Philadelphia Eagles players
Tampa Bay Buccaneers players
New Orleans Saints players
Arizona Hotshots players
Calgary Stampeders players
Toronto Argonauts players